Bear Island is an uninhabited island offshore of Baffin Island in the Qikiqtaaluk Region, Nunavut, Canada. The island lies in the Labrador Sea a few kilometres north of its confluence with Frobisher Bay. Other islands in the immediate vicinity of the tip of Hall Peninsula include the Harper Islands, Lefferts Island, Little Hall Island, and Hudson Island.

References 

Islands of Baffin Island
Uninhabited islands of Qikiqtaaluk Region
Islands of Frobisher Bay